Vehicle registration plates of Oman started in 1970. The current version started in 2001.

Vehicle types (new plates) 
There are several type of plates in Oman: (Private / Taxi / Commercial / learn driving/ government / political body / Authority Consulate / UN / Tractor / Bicycle mechanism / export / checking / rental)

Main district codes (for old plates ) 

The style is 89127 X(X(X)) with Arabic numbers followed with letters. X is district registered to:js

References 

Oman
Transport in Oman